The Venezuela women's national water polo team is the representative for Venezuela in international women's water polo.

Results

World Championship
2003 — 14th place
2005 — 14th place

See also
 Venezuela men's national water polo team

References

Water polo
Women's national water polo teams
National water polo teams in South America
National water polo teams by country